Roykot is a union parishad, the smallest administrative body of Bangladesh, located in Nangalkot Upazila, Comilla District, Bangladesh. The total population is 34,393.

References

Unions of Nangalkot Upazila